The following television stations in the United States brand as channel 18 (though neither using virtual channel 18 nor broadcasting on physical RF channel 18):
 WBGT-CD in Rochester, New York
 WVVA-DT2 in Bluefield, Virginia
 WWJE-DT in Derry, New Hampshire

The following television stations in the United States formerly branded as channel 18:
 WLNN-CD in Boone, North Carolina

18 branded